Stephan Ruggeri (born 13 October 1996) is an Argentine professional footballer who plays as a defender for Milwaukee Torrent.

Career
Ruggeri started in Primera B Nacional with Crucero del Norte, he previously had youth spells with River Plate, Vélez Sarsfield and Platense. He made his professional debut at the end of August 2016, starting a fixture with Nueva Chicago that he departed on forty-four minutes after receiving a red card. He made further appearances against Santamarina, Flandria and Juventud Unida in the 2016–17 season, which concluded with relegation to Torneo Federal A. Ruggeri played 2017–18 in the third tier, but with Huracán Las Heras having joined in August 2017. He played twice. Los Andes of Primera B Nacional signed Ruggeri in 2018.

Ruggeri didn't feature for Los Andes, though was an unused substitute for a league fixture with Central Córdoba on 23 November 2018. In June 2019, Ruggeri switched Argentina for the United States by agreeing terms with Milwaukee Torrent of the National Premier Soccer League.

Personal life
Ruggeri is the son of former footballer Oscar Ruggeri, who featured for the likes of Boca Juniors and Real Madrid as well as Argentina; with whom he won the 1986 FIFA World Cup. His sister, Candela, appeared with their father on the eleventh season of Bailando por un Sueño on eltrece in 2016.

Career statistics
.

References

External links

1996 births
Living people
Footballers from Buenos Aires
Argentine footballers
Association football defenders
Argentine expatriate footballers
Expatriate soccer players in the United States
Argentine expatriate sportspeople in the United States
Primera Nacional players
Torneo Federal A players
Crucero del Norte footballers
Club Atlético Los Andes footballers
Milwaukee Torrent players